Henry Kreis (1899–1963) was an American sculptor.

Life
He studied at the State School of Applied Arts in Munich. In 1947, he created the Wise virgins and Foolish virgins medal for the Society of Medalists.

In 1935 Kreis designed the Connecticut Tercentenary half dollar and in 1936 the Bridgeport, Connecticut, Centennial half dollar.

References

External links
https://www.aaa.si.edu/collections/henry-kreis-papers-9168

1899 births
1963 deaths
American sculptors
American currency designers
Coin designers